In mathematics, the Lusternik–Schnirelmann theorem, aka Lusternik–Schnirelmann–Borsuk theorem or LSB theorem, says as follows. 

If the sphere Sn is covered by n + 1 closed sets, then one of these sets contains a pair (x, −x) of antipodal points. 

It is named after Lazar Lyusternik and Lev Schnirelmann, who published it in 1930.

Equivalent results

References